Ungjin, also known as Gomanaru (Hangul: 고마나루, literally "bear port") is a former city on the Korean Peninsula.  It was located in modern-day Gongju, South Chungcheong province, South Korea.  It was the capital of Baekje from AD 475 to 538, during a period when Baekje was under threat from Goguryeo, the previous capital of Wiryeseong (modern-day Seoul) having been overrun. In 538, King Seong moved the capital to Sabi (in modern-day Buyeo County). Ungjin is now known as Gongju.

Notable historical places of Ungjin Baekje are Gongsan Fortress and Tomb of King Muryeong.

History
In 475, Baekje had an attack by Gogureyo army led by King Jangsu, and then Wiryeseong, the first capital of Baekje, was destroyed. Baekje's new king, Munju, moved its capital to Ungjin.

During the reign of King Muryeong, kingdom recovered its political stability, and diplomacy ties with Liang dynasty of China and Japan. Baekje brought Chinese culture, and introduced it to Silla, Gaya, and Japan.

Ungjin maintained its position until transfer of the capital in 538 by King Seong. Ungjin period regarded as a time of restored its national power and stability for revival.

See also
 Three Kingdoms of Korea
 History of Korea
 Wiryeseong 
 Sabi
Ungjin Commandery

References

Baekje
Gongju
Ancient Korean cities
Former capitals of Korea